Dispur is the capital of the Indian state of Assam and is a suburb of Guwahati.

It became the capital in 1973, when Shillong the erstwhile capital, became the capital of the state of Meghalaya that was carved out of Assam.

Dispur is the seat of power of Government of Assam. The Assam Secretariat (Janata Bhawan) building is located in Dispur along with the Assam Legislative Assembly House, MLA Hostels and the State Emergency Operations Centre. The Assam Trunk road and the G S road passes through Dispur. To the south of Dispur lies the theologically important site of Basistha Ashram and the Shankardev Kalakshetra, a cultural centre created in the 1990s. Next to Dispur is the township of Jatia.

The Guwahati Tea Auction Centre, one of the busiest tea trading facilities in the world, is located in the city.

Geography
The Bhorolu river (also Bhollobri) flows through the heart of the town.

Weather 
Dispur, being a part of Guwahati, has warm summers and cold winters. Winters are also accompanied by occasional rainfalls that bring down the temperature further. Monsoon season in Dispur commences from the month of June. Dispur monsoons are usually accompanied by severe thunderstorms along with heavy downpours.

Politics
Dispur is part of Gauhati (Lok Sabha constituency).BJP's Atul Bora is the incumbent MLA of Dispur (Vidhan Sabha constituency).

Tourist attractions 
Being the capital it is a well-planned locale. There are many tourist spots in Dispur –
Shilpagram is famous for cultural and handicraft heritage of Assam and other northeastern states. Ethnic jewellery, carpets, silk sarees, wooden and metal handicrafts are available here among others.
Basistha Ashram is six kilometres from Dispur. It is popular for Lord Shiva temple. The temple spread across 835 bighas of land. It stands on the bank of mountain streams which originates from the hills of Meghalaya which in turn becomes river Basistha and Bharalu that flows through the city.
Srimanta Sankaradeva Kalakshetra is a cultural institution located at Panjabari area of the region. The museum preserves the culture and tradition of Assam as well as the Northeast. It is named after the great cultural exponent and scholar of Assam Mahapurush Srimanta Sankardeva. Inside the museum could be found traditional jewellery, costumes, statues, articles, weapons, stone and inscriptions displaying the not only the culture of Assam but the whole northeast as well.

Healthcare 
Dispur is home to many hospitals and healthcare centers including Guwahati Neurological Research Centre (GNRC) Hospitals, Dispur Hospital and Capital State Dispensary.

See also
 Tourism in North East India
Beltola

References

External links 

 
 Dispur News Headlines
 About Dispur

 
Cities and towns in Kamrup Metropolitan district
Neighbourhoods in Guwahati
Planned cities in India